Camborne Roskear was an electoral division of Cornwall in the United Kingdom which returned one member to sit on Cornwall Council between 2013 and 2021. It was abolished at the 2021 local elections, being succeeded by Camborne Roskear and Tuckingmill.

Councillors

Extent
Camborne Roskear represented the north of the town of Camborne, as well as the area of Treverno and part of Tuckingmill (which is shared with the Pool and Tehidy and Camborne Trelowarren divisions). The division covered 186 hectares in total.

Election results

2017 election

2013 election

References

Camborne
Electoral divisions of Cornwall Council